George Bourne (1780–1845) was an American abolitionist.

George Bourne may also refer to:

George Bourne (footballer) (1929–2004), English footballer, played for Stoke City
George Bourne (photographer) (1875–1924), New Zealand photographer
George Hugh Bourne (1840–1925), English hymnodist, schoolmaster and warden
George Sturt (1863–1927), English writer who sometimes used the pseudonym "George Bourne"
George Bourne, fictional narrator of the Matt Braddock stories